This is a list of electricity-generating power stations in Michigan, sorted by type and name.  In 2019, Michigan had a total summer capacity of 29,457 MW through all of its power plants, and a net generation of 116,701 GWh.  The corresponding energy mix was 32.5% coal, 30.8% natural gas, 28.0% nuclear, 5.0% wind, 2.1% biomass, 1.4% hydroelectric, 0.1% solar, and 0.1% petroleum.  Coal use has decreased by half over the last decade,  replaced by natural gas and renewables.  60% of renewable generation is wind energy.

Michigan imports all coal and nuclear fuel (uranium), and 82% of natural gas. A goal to produce over 10% of electricity from in-state renewable sources was set in 2015. Major electric companies in Michigan include Detroit Edison (11,000 MW) and Consumers Power (9,000 MW).

Nuclear power stations
Nuclear power is a significant source of electrical power in Michigan, producing roughly one-quarter of the state's supply. The two active nuclear power plants supply Michigan less than 30% of its electricity.

Former nuclear power stations

See also Midland Cogeneration Venture, a plant abandoned before completion

Coal power stations

Coal power is the leading source of electricity in Michigan. Although Michigan has no active coal mines, coal is easily moved from other states by train and across the Great Lakes by lake freighters. The lower price of natural gas is leading to the closure of most coal plants with Consumer Energy planning to close all of its remaining coal plants by 2025 while DTE plans to retire 2100MW of coal power by 2023.

Former coal plants

Natural gas power stations
Michigan has some of its own natural gas production and is a leading state for natural gas transport and storage. Declining prices for natural gas in the early 21st century led to an increase in the number of natural gas power plants. Consumers Power announced a new 700 MW plant to be built near Flint beginning about 2015 while the city of Holland replaced its coal plant with a 114 MW natural gas plant In April 2018, DTE received permission for a 1,100 MW natural gas plant to replace a coal plant in St.  Clair.

Oil power stations
Fuel oils and other liquid fuels are only a minor fuel used in Michigan for power generation. Some units burn liquid fuel only while some multiple fuel units sometimes use liquid fuels as well. 

Former plants

Multiple fuel
Multiple fuel units may alter their fuel source depending to balance pricing, availability, and energy content.

Municipal solid waste
Waste to energy plants which use garbage to produce power are a minor source of Michigan's electricity.

Former plants:

Landfill gas
Landfill gas plants, which use methane collected from garbage dumps to power electrical generators, are in use near a number of Michigan landfills but are only a minor source of power.
 
Only plants larger than 4 MW

Former plants:

Biomass/waste power plants
Biomass power plants in Michigan often use waste from the lumber industry. Smaller units use food waste, or cow, pig and turkey waste.

Retired

Hydropower
Michigan has a number of small hydropower plants; however, the generally small, flat rivers provide a limited source of power.

Pumped storage hydropower power stations
Michigan has one pumped-storage hydroelectricity station, on the shore of Lake Michigan, used for power balancing. It is the fifth largest such plant in the world.

Wind power stations
Wind power in Michigan grew rapidly due to national price supports and a Michigan mandate to produce 10% renewable energy by 2015. The largest concentration of wind power is in the Thumb region.

As of February 2022

Solar power stations
Solar power is a very minor source of electricity in Michigan. 

Systems of over 2.0 MW, as of November 2022

References

Generators list, U.S. Energy Information Administration, accessed July 11, 2012 
Michigan, U.S. Energy Information Administration, accessed July 11, 2012

External links
Combined Heat and Power Units located in Michigan

Michigan

Lists of buildings and structures in Michigan